Gokada Go! is a Philippine teen-oriented comedy program on ABS-CBN which was aired from June 2 to July 21, 2007 replacing Let's Go!.

Synopsis
This sitcom started June 2007. This youth-oriented show revolves around the lives of several teenagers who are about to enter college. It features different characters battling with their own angst, as they try to make it in this world in a rather awkward stage, as they're not kids anymore, but they're also not full-fledged adults as well. Join them as they go about life, and relate with other people!

Tag along with the innocent Melody (portrayed by Kim Chiu) a streetsmart and confident girl fresh from Cebu; the overconfident Gab (Gerald Anderson), a bad boy with a soft spot; the cool and daring half-Italian, half- Bisaya Matteo (Matteo Guidicelli), as well as old faces such as the varsity heartthrob Bob (Joem Bascon), Bob's close buddy, Junniper (Eda Nolan) and Bangs (Valerie Garcia). This time, they have a strict dorm manager named Ms. Gina (Gina Pareño), who plays a doting mom to them all!

After almost two months, probably due to low ratings, the show was cut off-air.

Cast
Kim Chiu
Gerald Anderson
Gina Pareño
Matteo Guidicelli
Eda Nolan
Joem Bascon
Alex Gonzaga
Bangs Garcia
Badjie Mortiz
Kontin Roque
Jana Pablo
Dianne Medina

Episodes
Episode #1: First Day Go!
Episode #2: Biak Na Bato
Episode #3: Go Signal
Episode #4: Miss U Like Crazy
Episode #5: Let's Go Panty
Episode #6: The Naked Truth
Episode #7: Go Melody Go
Episode #8: Go Kini GO!

Trivia
As of July 21, 2007 Trish and Dianne from Let's Go! are back on the show.
As of July 28, 2007 the show was off-air/cancelled.

See also
Let's Go!
List of programs previously aired by ABS-CBN

ABS-CBN original programming
Philippine comedy television series
2007 Philippine television series debuts
2007 Philippine television series endings
Filipino-language television shows
Television series about teenagers